Habte Negash (born 1967) is a retired Ethiopian long-distance runner. He had success at the IAAF World Cross Country Championships, taking the junior silver in 1985 and going on to share in the senior team silver medal with Ethiopia at both the 1988 and 1991 editions.

Achievements

References

1967 births
Living people
Ethiopian male long-distance runners
Ethiopian male cross country runners
20th-century Ethiopian people
21st-century Ethiopian people